The alcohol laws of the United States regarding minimum age for purchase have changed over time.  In colonial America, generally speaking, there were no drinking ages, and alcohol consumption by young teenagers was common, even in taverns. In post-Revolutionary America, such laxity gradually changed due to religious sentiments (as embodied in the temperance movement) and a growing recognition in the medical community about the dangers of alcohol. The more modern history is given in the table below.  Unless otherwise noted, if different alcohol categories have different minimum purchase ages, the age listed below is set at the lowest age given (e.g. if the purchase age is 18 for beer and 21 for wine or spirits, as was the case in several states, the age in the table will read as "18", not "21").  In addition, the purchase age is not necessarily the same as the minimum age for consumption of alcoholic beverages, although they have often been the same.

As one can see in the table below, there has been much volatility in the states' drinking ages since the repeal of Prohibition in 1933.  Shortly after the ratification of the 21st amendment in December, most states set their purchase ages at 21 since that was the voting age at the time. Most of these limits remained constant until the early 1970s.  From 1969 to 1976, some 30 states lowered their purchase ages, generally to 18. This was primarily because the voting age was lowered from 21 to 18 in 1971 with the passing into law of the 26th amendment. Many states started to lower their minimum drinking age in response, most of this occurring in 1972 or 1973. Twelve states kept their purchase ages at 21 since repeal of Prohibition and never changed them.

From 1976 to 1983, several states voluntarily raised their purchase ages to 19 (or, less commonly, 20 or 21), in part to combat drunk driving fatalities. In 1984, Congress passed the National Minimum Drinking Age Act, which required states to raise their ages for purchase and public possession to 21 by October 1986 or lose 10% of their federal highway funds. By mid-1988, all 50 states and the District of Columbia had raised their purchase ages to 21 (but not Puerto Rico, Guam, or the Virgin Islands, see Additional Notes below). South Dakota and Wyoming were the final two states to comply with the age 21 mandate. The current drinking age of 21 remains a point of contention among many Americans, because of it being higher than the age of majority (18 in most states) and higher than the drinking ages of most other countries. The National Minimum Drinking Age Act is also seen as a congressional sidestep of the Tenth Amendment. Although debates have not been highly publicized, a few states have proposed legislation to lower their drinking age, while Guam raised its drinking age to 21 in July 2010.

Additional notes 
 Contrary to popular belief, since the National Minimum Drinking Age Act, not all states specifically prohibit minors' and young adults' consumption of alcohol in private settings.  That is because the federal law is concerned only with purchase and public possession, not private consumption, and contains several exceptions. As of January 1, 2007, 14 states and the District of Columbia ban underage consumption outright, 19 states do not specifically ban underage consumption outright, and 17 states have family member or location exceptions to their underage consumption laws. Federal law explicitly provides for religious, medical, employment and private clubs or establishments possession exceptions; .
 In the 1960s the age for buying or drinking beer and wine in the District of Columbia (Washington, D.C.) was 18; the age for hard liquor was 21. Residents from Virginia and Maryland would often drive to D.C. to obtain alcohol. In Louisiana, the 1987 law raising the age from 18 to 21 was deliberately written solely to comply with the National Minimum Drinking Age Act to avoid losing highway funding, while still allowing 18- to 20-year-olds to drink as before.  Not only did it still allow 18- to 20-year-olds to consume in private, it contained a major loophole allowing bars and stores to sell alcohol to 18- to 20-year-olds without penalty (despite purchase being technically illegal) which meant that the de facto age was still 18. In other words, the drinking age was 21 only on paper. This loophole was closed in 1995, but in 1996 the Louisiana Supreme Court declared a drinking age of 21 unconstitutional.  That briefly lowered the de jure purchase age to 18, causing an uproar which prompted the Louisiana Supreme Court to reverse its decision, raising the age to 21 three months later. Other exceptions still remain to this day, including drinking in a private residence, and Louisiana still has some of the most liberal general alcohol laws of any state.
 Some states were "dry" well before national Prohibition was enacted in 1919, in some cases since achieving statehood.  Also, some states did not become fully "wet" until several years after the repeal of Prohibition in 1933 (e.g. Mississippi in 1966).  Since 1966, all states and territories of the USA have been "wet", but dry counties and towns still exist in some states.

References

Alcohol law in the United States

Legal drinking age